Bright Victory is a 1951 American drama romance war film directed by Mark Robson and starring Arthur Kennedy and Peggy Dow.

Plot
During World War II, American sergeant Larry Nevins is blinded by a German sniper while fighting in North Africa. He is taken to a Pennsylvania hospital for other blinded soldiers, where he struggles to accept and come to terms with his disability.

Though initially despondent, Larry is taught to orient himself and walk through the grounds and in town by memorization and with use of a cane. He befriends Joe Morgan, another blinded veteran, and Judy, a local bank teller who volunteers by socializing with disabled soldiers.

One day, Larry, unaware that Joe is black, utters a racial slur, causing a rift between Larry and the others. Meanwhile, he progresses well in his recovery, passing a crucial test to see how well he can handle himself on the street. He is cleared for furlough, so Judy takes him to spend a weekend at her sister's nearby cabin, where he goes fishing and is entertained by her family.

From Judy's brother-in-law, Larry learns of a very successful blind lawyer, giving him hope for the future. After dinner, Judy reveals her love for him. Larry tells her that he needs more security and family support and already has a fiancée in his Florida hometown. Somewhat dispirited, he goes home and has a rough time dealing with the racial attitudes of his Southern parents and friends. His fiancée's family is having doubts about his fitness as a son-in-law, and his parents are downcast because of his disability.

Larry is happy to see his fiancée Chris, though he still thinks of Judy. After a bad experience at his homecoming party, he tells Chris the difficulties that they can expect with his disability, and that he wants to relocate rather than be patronized with the menial local job that her successful father has offered him.  After some thought, Chris tells Larry that she does not feel strong enough to marry and move far away with him while he struggles to make a new life for both of them.

Returning to the hospital, Larry takes a side trip to Philadelphia and meets the successful blind lawyer played by Frank Wilcox. The lawyer tells him that life is difficult but worth it and that his wife was an invaluable helper to him in his career.

At the train station en route to begin a more advanced rehabilitation course, Larry is unexpectedly reunited with Judy. They joyfully declare their mutual love.

Boarding the train, he hears Joe Morgan's name called. He catches Joe's arm, apologizes for all the hurt he has caused and asks if they can be friends; Joe accepts the apology. They board and sit together as the train pulls out of the station.

Cast

 Arthur Kennedy as Larry Nevins
 Peggy Dow as Judy Greene
 Julie Adams as Chris Paterson (as Julia Adams)
 James Edwards as Joe Morgan
 Will Geer as Mr. Lawrence Nevins
 Nana Bryant as Mrs. Claire Nevins
 Jim Backus as Bill Grayson
 Minor Watson as Mr. Edward Paterson
 Joan Banks as Janet Grayson
 Richard Egan as Sgt. John Masterson
 John Hudson as Cpl. John Flagg
 Marjorie Crossland as Mrs. Paterson
 Donald Miele as 'Moose' Garvey
 Murray Hamilton as Pete Hamiton
 Larry Keating as Jess Coe
 Hugh Reilly as Capt. Phelan
 Mary Cooper as Nurse Bailey
 Rock Hudson as Dudek
 Ken Harvey as Joe Scanlon
 Russell Dennis as Pvt. Fred Tyler
 Philip Faversham as Lt. Atkins (as Phil Faversham)
 Robert F. Simon as Psychiatrist
 Virginia Mullen as Mrs. Coe
 Ruth Esherick as Nurse

Awards
Bright Victory was nominated for Academy Awards for Best Actor in a Leading Role (Arthur Kennedy) and Best Sound Recording (Leslie I. Carey). The film was also entered into the 1951 Cannes Film Festival.

Filming locations
Part of the film was made at Valley Forge General Army Hospital in Phoenixville, Pennsylvania, and the town's name is mentioned in the film. Scenes were also shot in downtown Phoenixville, Kimberton, and at Broad Street Station in Philadelphia.

References

External links
 
 
 
 
 

1951 films
1951 romantic drama films
1950s war drama films
American black-and-white films
American romantic drama films
American war drama films
1950s English-language films
Films about blind people
Films based on American novels
Films directed by Mark Robson
Films set in Pennsylvania
Films shot in Pennsylvania
Universal Pictures films
American World War II films
Films scored by Frank Skinner
1950s American films